Ivan Fedorovych Firtsak-Kroton (autonym Firtsak) (July 28, 1899, Bilky (now Irshava district of Zakarpattia Oblast of Ukraine) — November 10, 1970, the same place) was Ukrainian circus performer, athlete, wrestler, boxer and freestyle wrestler, once said to be the world's strongest man.

Biography 

He was born in a peasants’ family. In 1919 he moved to Prague to earn a living, where he first worked at a circus.

In the 1920s he began to win fighting tournaments and competitions in Prague. He repeatedly became a winner of the Prague heavy-weight club Prague—Bubenech and became a champion of Czechoslovakia in hand-to-hand fighting and weight-lifting. Later, he was a circus performer at the Hertsfert-circus. He visited a majority of European countries and traveled to the United States. He performed under the pseudonym Ivan-Syla (Strong Ivan) in 64 countries. His routine included ripping iron chains apart; bending nails with his fingers, making stick figures; lying on broken glass while hefting 500 kilograms of weight and juggling heavy objects.

He competed against world champions in boxing. Later he took the name of the legendary Kroton-hero (Сroton), who came to the Olympic stadium with a bull on his shoulders, holding it for more than an hour and a half. Firtsak matched this feat. Later he toured Europe and America, in solo shows. He performed before the English Queen. He was a winner of the body show in Paris. In 1928 he was acknowledged to be the strongest man on the planet.

In 1930 he returned to his native village. After Zakarpattia became part of the USSR, he headed a police department in Bilky.
In October, 1945 in honor of the anniversary of Zakarpattia's liberation in Uzhhorod drama theatre he fought 13 time USSR champion, weight-lifter Yakov Kutsenko. The fight ended in a draw.

He did not leave circus activity until his death. He took part in many regional and republic competitions in heavy athletics, kettle bell lifting, and actively promoted strength for sport and health.

Recognition 

 Since 1999 the annual competitions in weight-lifting on I. Firtsak-Kroton’s award are conducted in the village Belki.
 The writer Anton Kopinets wrote the book Kroton about his life.
 In 2013 Viktor Anriyenko made the movie Ivan (Strong Ivan) about him. The leading role was performed by Dmitriy Khaladzhi.

In 2016 Uzhhorod renamed the Nikolai Vatutin street to Ivan Firtsak street.

References

External links 

 

1899 births
1970 deaths
20th-century circus performers
People associated with physical culture
People from Zakarpattia Oblast
Ukrainian circus performers
Ukrainian male boxers
Ukrainian police officers
Ukrainian strength athletes
Ukrainian wrestlers